Dillon du Preez (born 8 November 1981 in Port Elizabeth, Cape Province) is a South African cricketer. He currently plays for the Eagles (formerly Free State) and the Royal Challengers Bangalore. He is a right-arm fast bowler and bats right-handed.

Playing career
Dillon du Preez made his debut for Free State in the 2003–04 season, appearing in a first class match against the touring West Indies national cricket team, with his first wicket being Shivnarine Chanderpaul and finishing with figures of 3 for 75. His interest in cricket began after attending a cricketing academy managed by international cricketers Corrie van Zyl and Rudi Steyn. During the 2007–08 season, du Preez led the Eagles to victory with 55 wickets. In the 2008 English county season, du Preez played for Leicestershire. In 2009, du Preez signed for the Bangalore Royal Challengers of the Indian Premier League, making his debut against the Mumbai Indians on 3 May 2009, taking two back-to-back wickets in his first over, including that of Sachin Tendulkar. In the same match, du Preez took his third IPL wicket (Jean-Paul Duminy).

Apart from being a talented and accurate fast bowler, he has often shown himself to be a capable batsman, having scored two first class centuries as well as scoring an unbeaten century in a List A match against Yorkshire, while playing for Leicestershire . He was included in the Free State cricket team squad for the 2015 Africa T20 Cup. In August 2017, he was named in Benoni Zalmi's squad for the first season of the T20 Global League. However, in October 2017, Cricket South Africa initially postponed the tournament until November 2018, with it being cancelled soon after.

References

External links
Dillon du Preez at Cricinfo

1981 births
Living people
South African cricketers
Free State cricketers
Knights cricketers
Leicestershire cricketers
Royal Challengers Bangalore cricketers
Uthura Rudras cricketers
Cricketers from Port Elizabeth
Afrikaner people